The North American FJ-4 Fury is a swept-wing carrier-capable fighter-bomber for the United States Navy and Marine Corps. The final development in a lineage that included the Air Force's F-86 Sabre, the FJ-4 shared its general layout and engine with the earlier FJ-3, but featured an entirely new wing design and was a vastly different design in its final embodiment.

Design and development
Compared to that of the FJ-3, the FJ-4's new wing was much thinner, with a six percent thickness-to-chord ratio, and featured skin panels milled from solid alloy plates. It also had an increased area, and tapered more sharply towards the tips. Slight camber behind the leading edge improved low speed characteristics. The main landing gear design had to be considerably modified to fold wheel and strut within the contours of the new wing. The track of the main wheels was increased and because they were closer to the center of gravity, there was less weight on the nosewheel. Wing folding was limited to the outer wing panels.

The FJ-4 was intended as an all-weather interceptor, a role that required considerable range on internal fuel. The FJ-4 had 50% more fuel capacity than the FJ-3 and was lightened by omitting armor and reducing ammunition capacity. The new wing was "wet"; that is, it provided for integral fuel tankage. The fuselage was deepened to add more fuel, and had a distinctive "razorback" rear deck. A modified cockpit made the pilot more comfortable during the longer missions. The tail surfaces were also extensively modified and had a thinner profile. The overall changes resulted in an aircraft that had little in common with the earlier models, although a family resemblance was still present. The two prototypes had the same Wright J65-W-4 engine as the FJ-3, but production aircraft had the J65-W-16A of  thrust.

The first FJ-4 flew on 28 October 1954 and delivery began in February 1955.

Of the original order for 221, the last 71 were modified in the FJ-4B fighter-bomber version. This had a stronger wing with six instead of four underwing stations and stronger landing gear. Additional aerodynamic brakes under the aft fuselage made landing safer by allowing pilots to use higher thrust settings, and were also useful for dive attacks. External load was doubled. The most important characteristic of the FJ-4B, however, was that it was capable of carrying a nuclear weapon on the inboard port station. It was equipped with the LABS or Low-Altitude Bombing System for the delivery of nuclear weapons. The Navy was eager to maintain a nuclear role in its rivalry with the Air Force, and it equipped 10 squadrons with the FJ-4B. It was also flown by three Marine squadrons. In April 1956 the Navy ordered 151 more FJ-4Bs, for a total of 152 FJ-4s and 222 FJ-4Bs produced, and 1,115 FJ aircraft of all variants delivered to the Navy and Marine Corps.

The Navy ordered six FJ-4s to be converted to FJ-4F to test rocket engines, but only two were completed. These featured the North American Rocketdyne AR-1 engine, installed in a fairing above the tail pipe of the jet engine. It ran on hydrogen peroxide and JP-4 jet fuel, and provided an additional  of thrust for short periods. The FJ-4F reached speeds of Mach 1.41 and altitude of 71,000 ft (21,600 m).

Redesignation
With the 1962 adoption of the Tri-Service aircraft designation system, the FJ-4 became the F-1E and the FJ-4B the AF-1E. AF-1Es served with United States Naval Reserve units until the late 1960s.

Variants

XFJ-4
Two prototypes with a J65-W-4 engine and re-designed fuselage.
YFJ-4
One FJ-4 used for development testing.
FJ-4 Fury
 Single-seat fighter-bomber version, powered by a  Wright J65-W-16A turbojet engine, 150 built.
FJ-4B Fury
 Single-seat ground-attack close support version with six underwing pylons, 222 built.
FJ-4F Fury
 Test and evaluation aircraft, fitted with an auxiliary rocket motor and supplementary fuel tank, two conversions from FJ-4.
F-1E Fury
 Redesignation of the FJ-4.
AF-1E Fury
 Redesignation of the FJ-4B.
AF-1F (NA-295)
 Proposed light-attack version with TF30 engine, competitor to the A-7; not built.

Operators

 United States Navy
 United States Marine Corps

Surviving aircraft

On display
FJ-4A
139486 - National Naval Aviation Museum, NAS Pensacola, Florida.
139516 - Historic Aviation Memorial Museum in Tyler, Texas.

FJ-4B
139531 - Pima Air & Space Museum, adjacent to Davis-Monthan AFB in Tucson, Arizona.
143557 - Georgia Veterans Memorial State Park in Cordele, Georgia.
143568 - Wings of Freedom Aviation Museum in Horsham, Pennsylvania.
143575 - was privately owned in San Antonio, Texas.  However, it has been reported as sold and the FAA certificate is expired.
143610 - The Buffalo and Erie County Naval & Military Park in Buffalo, New York.

Specifications (FJ-4)

See also

References

Notes

Bibliography

 
 Avery, Norm. North American Aircraft 1934–1998 Volume 1. Santa Ana, California: Narkiewicz/Thompson, 1998. .
 
 Bowman, Martin. F-86 Sabre. London: Airlife, 2004. .
 Dorr, Robert F. "Fury: The Navy's Sabre." Air International, January 1993.
 Dorr, Robert F. "North American FJ Fury." Aeroplane Monthly, February 2006.
 Kinzey, Bert. FJ Fury (Detail & Scale Vol. 68, 8272). Carollton, Texas: Squadron Signal Books, 2003. .
 Taylor, John, W.R., ed. "North American FJ Fury." Jane's All the World's Aircraft 1965–1966. London: Jane's All the World's Aircraft, 1967. .
 Wagner, Ray. The North American Sabre. London: Macdonald, 1963. No ISBN.
 Wilson, Stewart. Combat Aircraft since 1945. Fyshwick, ACT, Australia: Aerospace Publications Pty Ltd., 2000. .
 Wilson, Stewart F-86 Sabre / MiG-15 Fagot / Hawker Hunter. London: Aerospace Publications Pty Ltd, 1995. .
 Winchester, Jim, ed. "North American FJ Fury." Military Aircraft of the Cold War (The Aviation Factfile). London: Grange Books plc, 2006. .

External links

(1959) NAVAER 01-60JKD-501A Supplemental Flight Handbook Navy Models FJ-4 and FJ4-B Aircraft

F01J-4
1950s United States fighter aircraft
Single-engined jet aircraft
Low-wing aircraft
Carrier-based aircraft
FJ-4
Aircraft first flown in 1954